Marika Cifor is an American archivist and feminist academic known for her work in archival science and digital studies. Her research focuses on  community archives, HIV/AIDS, affect theory, and approaches to archival practice rooted in social justice. She is an assistant professor at the University of Washington Information School. She also holds an adjunct faculty appointment in Gender, Women and Sexuality studies at the University of Washington.

Career
Cifor completed a B.A. in History and Political, Legal and Economic Analysis at Mills College and an M.A. in history and an M.L.I.S. from Simmons University and a Ph.D. in Information Studies with graduate certificates in Gender Studies and Digital Humanities at the University of California, Los Angeles. While a doctoral student, Cifor was a member of the UCLA Community Archives Lab directed by Michelle Caswell. 

Following her PhD studies Cifor was appointed as a Consortium for Faculty Diversity postdoctoral fellow with the Gender, Sexuality, and Women's Studies Program at Bowdoin College.  In fall 2018 she was hired as an assistant professor in the Department of Information and Library Science at Indiana University Bloomington.  In fall 2019, she became an assistant professor at the University of Washington Information School. Cifor teaches courses related to archival theory and practice and gender, race, and technology with a focus on social justice and community archives. She is a founder and core faculty member of the school's AfterLab and an affiliate with its Technology and Social Change Group and DataLab.  In addition, Cifor has served on the editorial board of Australian Feminist Studies and the Homosaurus: An International LGBTQ+ Linked Data Vocabulary.  

Cifor's 2022 book Viral Cultures: Activist Archiving in the Age of AIDS examined the archives and legacy of HIV/AIDS activism.  Viral Cultures was named one of nine books by which to better understand health, illness and viruses in a June 2022 article in The Atlantic by Joseph Osmundson.  In 2017 she was awarded the SAA's Fellows' Ernst Posner Award, with co-authors Michelle Caswell and Mario H. Ramirez, for their article "To Suddenly Discover Yourself Existing: Uncovering the Impact of Community Archives". Cifor has co-edited special issues including of First Monday (journal) on AIDS and Digital Media in 2020 with Cait McKinney, of Archival Science on Affect and the Archive, Archives and their Affects in 2016 with Anne J. Gilliland, and the Journal of Critical Library and Information Studies on Neobliberalism in  Information Studies in 2019 with Jamie A. Lee. While she at University of California, Los Angeles, she co-created the collaborative digital humanities project,  Early African American Film: Reconstructing the History of Silent Race Films, 1909-1930, on Race film which received honorable mention for the 2016 Garfinkel Prize in Digital Humanities from the American Studies Association.

Select publications

References

American archivists
Female archivists
Living people
University of Washington faculty
Mills College alumni
Simmons University alumni
University of California, Los Angeles alumni
American women academics
21st-century American women
1986 births